Wells Fargo Capitol Center (formerly Wachovia Capitol Center and First Union Capitol Center) is a 30-story 121.92 m high-rise skyscraper at 150 Fayetteville Street in Raleigh, North Carolina with  of space. Completed in 1990, it was one of the downtown Raleigh's two tallest buildings for nearly twenty years, and is currently third tallest.

History

In 1999, DRA Advisors bought First Union Capitol Center.

After the merger of First Union and Wachovia, Wachovia moved out of its 11-story  building built in 1961.

On January 31, 2007, Argus Realty Investors LP of San Clemente, California paid $153.4 million for Wachovia Capitol Center and its parking deck, plus retail space across the street. The amount was the most ever paid for a Triangle office building. At the time, Wachovia occupied , and other major tenants included Deloitte & Touche, PriceWaterhouse Coopers, Merrill Lynch, and KPMG, as well as the city's largest law firm Smith Anderson Blount.

As a result of six transactions, HighBrook Investors paid $42.74 million for 31.57 percent of Wells Fargo Capitol Center, whose ownership is a tenants in common structure. As of December 4, 2015, the building had  of leasable space available, with  more expected in 2016. Major tenants other than Wells Fargo included Brooks Pierce, Smith Anderson, BHDP Architecture and RM Source. Parker Poe had already left and Womble Carlyle Sandridge & Rice planned to move in 2016.

See also 
 List of tallest buildings in Raleigh

References

External links

Skyscraper office buildings in Raleigh, North Carolina
Wells Fargo buildings
Office buildings completed in 1990